"Summer Time" is a 2020 song recorded by Canadian country group James Barker Band. It was co-written by the band's frontman James Barker, with Gavin Slate, Travis Wood, and producer Todd Clark.

Background
"Summer Time" was released amidst the COVID-19 pandemic, following a run of seventy-five consecutive live stream shows online from the band. Frontman James Barker reflected on the importance of summer to Canadians and wanted to spread some optimism in the pandemic summer, saying "we hope ... fans connect with that nostalgic feeling of a more relaxed state of mind".

Critical reception
Katie Colley of ET Canada called the song "catchy", saying it puts you in the "summer spirit". 93.7 JR Country referred to the track as a "summer anthem" and "sunshine for your ears", noting "shimmery guitar riffs and James Barker's warm vocals". Chris Parton of Sounds Like Nashville said the song is "purpose built for fun in the sun" with "breezy guitars" and "a foot-tapping beat", noting Barker's "bright, carefree vocal".

Commercial performance
"Summer Time" reached a peak of  15 on Billboard Canada Country chart, marking the band's eighth Top 20 hit. It also charted at No. 24 on the Hot Canadian Digital Songs chart in the week after its release.

Live performance
James Barker Band performed "Summer Time" live at the 2020 Canadian Country Music Awards, with the band being split into groups of two, performing from both Oro-Medonte, Ontario and Nashville, Tennessee. The award show was broadcast live on Global in Canada, as well as on the Global App, and aired on several Corus radio stations in Alberta and Ontario.

Credits and personnel
Credits adapted from AllMusic.

 James Barker – lead vocals, songwriting
 Todd Clark — backing vocals, production, engineering, guitar, keyboard, programming, songwriting
 Dave Cohen – keyboard
 Matty Green – mixing
 Tony Lucido – bass guitar
 Rob McNeeley – guitar
 Andrew Mendelson – master engineering
 Justin Ostrander – guitar
 Jerry Roe – drums
 Justin Schipper – steel guitar
 Gavin Slate – backing vocals, guitar, programming, songwriting
 Travis Wood – backing vocals, songwriting

Charts

References

2020 songs
2020 singles
James Barker Band songs
Songs written by James Barker (singer)
Songs written by Todd Clark
Songs written by Gavin Slate
Songs written by Travis Wood (songwriter)
Song recordings produced by Todd Clark
Universal Music Canada singles